Juste Brouzes (20 January 1894 – 28 February 1973) was a French footballer. He competed in the men's tournament at the 1928 Summer Olympics.

References

External links
 

1894 births
1973 deaths
French footballers
France international footballers
Olympic footballers of France
Footballers at the 1928 Summer Olympics
Footballers from Paris
Association football midfielders
Red Star F.C. players